Jack's the Boy is a 1932 British comedy film directed by Walter Forde and starring Jack Hulbert, Cicely Courtneidge, Francis Lister and Peter Gawthorne. It became well known for its song "The Flies Crawled Up the Window", sung by Hulbert, which was released as a record and proved a major hit. The film was released in the U.S. as Night and Day.

Plot
Policeman Jack (Jack Hulbert) attempts to track down a gang responsible for a smash and grab raid, thereby proving his worth to his disapproving father (Peter Gawthorne), a Scotland Yard detective.

Cast

 Jack Hulbert as Jack Brown
 Cicely Courtneidge as Mrs Bobday
 Winifred Shotter as Ivy
 Francis Lister as Jules Martin
 Peter Gawthorne as Mr Brown
 Ben Field as Mr Bobday
 Charles Farrell as Martin
 O. B. Clarence as Tompkins
 Hal Gordon as Man with scarf at accident
 Arthur Rigby as Police Constable

Reception
The film was voted the fourth best British movie of 1932.

British Pictures wrote, "As entertainment, it's curious. Hulbert and Courtneidge clown about nicely but it's hard to see how this film was one of the biggest hits of its year (big enough to be the punchline of a comic song in the following year's The Good Companions). Opportunities for them to "do their stuff" are poked into the narrative in the oddest places. They search a thief's flat and spontaneously break into a silly dance. It would be charming if it wasn't so bloody irritating. Perhaps the most interesting bits of the film now are the sequences filmed on location both on the streets of London and in Madame Tussauds (though you have to doubt the effectiveness of any film chase sequence in which you get more interested in the passing billboards than the action). All in all, it's a film which has dated badly and which doesn't show off the stars to their best advantage"; while TV Guide wrote that though the "Dialog drags a bit, as though it's being read for the stage. Hulbert saves his performance with a lot of likable charm"; and AllMovie called it a "breezy quota quickie", concluding that "Matching Jack Hulbert laugh for laugh is his wife and longtime stage partner Cicely Courteneidge"; and Screenonline noted that "Jack's the Boy is acknowledged as one of the team's best films."

References

External links

1932 films
1932 comedy films
British comedy films
Gainsborough Pictures films
Films produced by Michael Balcon
Films directed by Walter Forde
Films scored by Jack Beaver
1930s police comedy films
British black-and-white films
1930s English-language films
1930s British films